Stomopteryx bivittella is a moth of the family Gelechiidae. It was described by Pierre Chrétien in 1915. It is found in Tunisia.

The wingspan is 11–15 mm. The forewings are white with a subcostal band. The hindwings are whitish.

References

Moths described in 1915
Stomopteryx